Platanthera leptopetala is a species of orchid known by the common names narrow-petal rein orchid, and lacy rein orchid. It is native to the west coast of the United States from Washington to California, where it grows in scrub and woodland habitat in mountains and foothills. This orchid grows erect to about 70 centimeters in maximum height from a bulbous caudex. The basal leaves are up to 15 centimeters long by 3 wide. Leaves higher on the stem are much reduced. The upper part of the stem is a spikelike inflorescence of many delicate, translucent green flowers which are sometimes fragrant in the evenings. This rein orchid has narrower petals than those of other species, giving the inflorescence a lacy look, as the common names suggest.

References

External links 
 Jepson Manual Treatment
 USDA Plants Profile
 Flora of North America
 Photo gallery

leptopetala
Endemic orchids of the United States
Orchids of California
Flora of Oregon
Flora of Washington (state)
Flora of the Cascade Range
Flora of the Sierra Nevada (United States)
Natural history of the California chaparral and woodlands
Natural history of the California Coast Ranges
Natural history of the Peninsular Ranges
Natural history of the Transverse Ranges
Flora without expected TNC conservation status